This is a table of river distances of various locations along the Murray River upstream from Echuca, Victoria and Mannum, South Australia, arguably the two most important river ports in the steamboat era. Negative values indicate distances downstream. Many of the places listed are of historic interest only.

Note that river distances are by their nature highly imprecise, will always be greater than straight line distances, and frequently greater than road distances.

See also
 List of Darling River distances
 List of Murray River crossings
 List of Murrumbidgee River distances
 Murray-Darling basin includes useful chart of tributaries

References 

New South Wales-related lists
South Australia-related lists
Victoria (Australia)-related lists
Distances